Ian Niall (7 November 1916 – 24 June 2002), born John Kincaid McNeillie, was a writer from Galloway, Scotland. He wrote works under both these names. He was born in Old Kilpatrick, to parents from the Machars in South West Scotland. He moved back to Galloway at 18 months old, and the area formed a basis for his early fiction. In the 1940s he moved to North Wales, where his son, the writer Andrew McNeillie, was born. He died in Chesham, Buckinghamshire, in south-east England.

Films
The 1951 film No Resting Place, based on Ian Niall's novel, was directed by Paul Rotha and produced by Colin Lesslie Productions. It starred Michael Gough.

The 1964 film A Tiger Walks, directed by Norman Tokar and starring Vera Miles and Brian Keith, is also based on Niall's works.

Bibliography
Wigtown Ploughman: Part of His Life (1939, Putnam, as John McNeillie; 2012, Birlinn Limited )
Glasgow Keelie (1940, Putnam, as John McNeillie)
Morryharn Farm (1941, Putnam, as John McNeillie)
No Resting Place (1948, Heinemann). The first under the name "Ian Niall", filmed by Paul Rotha
Tune on a Melodeon (1948, Heinemann)
Foxhollow (1949, Heinemann)
The Poacher's Handbook (1950, Heinemann)
The Deluge (1951, Heinemann)
Fresh Woods (1951, Heinemann; 2012, Little Toller Books)
Pastures New (1951, Heinemann; 2012, Little Toller Books)
The Boy Who Saw Tomorrow (1952, Heinemann)
A Tiger Walks (1960, Heinemann)
The New Poacher's Handbook (1960, Heinemann)
Trout From the Hills (1961, Heinemann)
The Harmless Albatross(1961, Heinemann)
Hey Delaney! (1962, Heinemann)
The Game Keeper (1965, Heinemann)
The Country Blacksmith (1966, Heinemann)
A Galloway Childhood (1967, Heinemann) 
A Fowler's World: an account of days on the marsh and estuary (1968, Heinemann)
A Galloway Shepherd (1970, Heinemann)
The Village Policeman (1971, Heinemann)
Around My House (1973, Heinemann)
A London Boyhood (1974, Heinemann)
One Man and his Dogs (1975, Heinemann)
To Speed the Plough(1977, Heinemann)
The Idler's Companion (1978, Heinemann)
The Forester (1979, Heinemann)
Portrait of a Country Artist. Charles Tunnicliffe R.A. 1901–1979 (1980 Gollancz)
Tunnicliffe's Countryside(1983, Clive Holloway Books)
Feathered Friends (1984, Chatto)
Country Matters (1984, Gollancz)
Ian Niall's Complete Angler (1986, Heinemann)
Ian Niall's Country Notes (1987, Octopus Books)
English Country Traditions (1990 V&A)
The Way of a Countryman (1965 and 1993, Heinemann)
Country Life (1953–1993, regular column as Ian Niall)

External links and references
Part of his life
Obituary in the Glasgow Herald
Entry on Ian Niall.

References

Further reading
John Manson, Ploughmen and Byremen: Novels of Barke, McNellie and Bryce. In Ross, Raymond, ed., Cencrastus No. 52, pp. 3–5. 

Scottish novelists
Scottish science fiction writers
1916 births
2002 deaths
People from Wigtown
People from Clydebank
20th-century Scottish novelists
Scottish male novelists
20th-century British male writers